Ursus Minor Mountain is a  mountain summit located in Glacier National Park, in the Hermit Range of the Selkirk Mountains in British Columbia, Canada. Its nearest higher peak is Grizzly Mountain,  to the east-northeast. The first ascent of the mountain was made in 1907 by Rupert W. Haggen, with guide Edouard Feuz Jr. The mountain's name was adopted in 1906, then re-approved September 8, 1932, by the Geographical Names Board of Canada. It was so-named because of its proximity above Bear Creek (since renamed Connaught Creek), and in keeping with the bear theme of other nearby features such as Ursus Major Mountain, Grizzly Mountain, Bruins Pass, and Balu Pass.

Climate
Based on the Köppen climate classification, Ursus Minor Mountain is located in a subarctic climate zone with cold, snowy winters, and mild summers. Temperatures can drop below −20 °C with wind chill factors below −30 °C. Precipitation runoff from the mountain and meltwater from a small unnamed glacier on its north slope drains into tributaries of the Illecillewaet River and Beaver River.

See also

 Geography of British Columbia
 Geology of British Columbia

References

External links
 Weather: Ursus Minor Mountain

Two-thousanders of British Columbia
Selkirk Mountains
Glacier National Park (Canada)
Columbia Country
Kootenay Land District